Eichenbarleben is a village and a former municipality in the Börde district in Saxony-Anhalt, Germany. Since 1 January 2010, it is part of the municipality Hohe Börde.

Notable residents
Gustav von Alvensleben (1803–1881), general
Constantin von Alvensleben (1809–1892), general

Former municipalities in Saxony-Anhalt
Hohe Börde